Max Thornell (born 1970) is a Swedish musician, most widely recognized as the drummer of Swedish death metal band Hearse. Also with Johan Liiva from Hearse, he played drums, keyboards and performed some backing vocals in early 90s death metal band Furbowl. The other Max's band is Swedish thrash metal band Satanarchy.

Discography

Furbowl
 Those Shredded Dreams (1992)
 The Autumn Years (1994)

Satanarchy
 Disgraceful World (2002)

Hearse
 Dominion Reptilian (2003)
 Armageddon, Mon Amour (2004)
 The Last Ordeal (2005)
 In These Veins (2006)

References

External links
 Max Thornell at MySpace

1970 births
Musicians from Stockholm
Swedish heavy metal drummers
Living people
21st-century drummers